Jungsu Choi Tiny Orkester (JTO) is an experimental large jazz ensemble comprising ten performers and composer, Jungsu Choi.

JTO's European debut album Tschüss Jazz Era was released on Challenge Records, followed by a stage appearance at BIMHUIS, Amsterdam. Their music is recognized as unique reinterpretation of old jazz standards such as "Anthropology", "Spain", and "Take the 'A' Train" (retitled as "What if Ellington Didn't Take the A Train?"). JTO was nominated for Korean Music Awards 2019 (category: best jazz performance of the year).

Background 
JTO is led by Jungsu Choi (born 1975), a Korean composer, arranger and band leader based in Europe and Korea. His composition is mainly focusing on big jazz ensemble but also electronic and diverse ensemble. His primary artistic vehicle is JTO.

Members
 Jungsu Choi – Composer, Arranger and Band leader
 Jinho Pyo – Male voice
 Eunmi Kim – Flute
 Youngkwang Kim – Alto saxophone
 Hachul Song – Tenor saxophone
 Yeajung Kim – Trumpet
 Junyeon Lee – Trombone
 Jungyun Ahn – Cello
 Jungmin Lee – Piano
 Sungyun Hong – Guitar
 Inseob Song – Bass
 Hyunsu Lee – Drums

Discography 

 Jungsu Choi New Jazz Orchestra in London The Big band (Good International, 2011)
 Jungsu Choi Music Electric Portrait - The Dance (Pison Contents, 2015)
 Jungsu Choi Tiny Orkester Tschuss Jazz Era (Challenge Records, 2018)

References

External links 

 

Jazz ensembles